The 2010 Senior Open Championship was a senior major golf championship and the 24th Senior Open Championship, held from 22–25 July at Carnoustie Golf Links in Carnoustie, Scotland. It was the first Senior Open Championship played at the course and the eighth Senior Open Championship played as a senior major championship.

World Golf Hall of Fame member Bernhard Langer won by one stroke over 1995 U.S. Open champion Corey Pavin. The 2010 event was Langer's first senior major championship victory.

Venue

The 2010 event was the first Senior Open Championship played at Carnoustie. The course came to host the Senior Open Championship for a second time six years later, in 2016.

Course layout

Field
The field consisted of 144 competitors: 136 professionals and 8 amateurs. An 18-hole stroke play qualifying round was held on Monday, 19 July for players who were not already exempt.

Nationalities in the field

Past champions in the field

Made the cut

Missed the cut

Past winners and runners-up at The Open Championship in the field 
The field included five former winners of The Open Championship. Three of them made the cut; 1996 Open champion Tom Lehman (tied 11th),1989 Open champion Mark Calcavecchia (tied 14th), 1975, 1977, 1980, 1982 and 1983 Open champion Tom Watson (tied 24th).1985 Open champion Sandy Lyle and 1963 Open champion Bob Charles did not make the cut.

The field also included six former runners-up at The Open Championship; Bernhard Langer (won), John Cook (tied 11th), Gordon J. Brand (tied 50th), Wayne Grady (tied 50th), Costantino Rocca (missed cut) and Mike Harwood (missed cut).

Round summaries

First round
Thursday, 22 July 2010

Bernhard Langer, Jay Don Blake, and Carl Mason posted four-under-par 67s on day one to share the lead by one stroke.

Second round
Friday 23 July 2010

Corey Pavin shot a second consecutive 69 (−2) to tie Bernhard Langer for the lead. Langer shot an even-par 71.

Amateurs: Haag (+6), Simson (+8), Stubbs (+10), Vallis (+15), Gilchrist (+16), Mercier (+17), Lockwood (+25), Rogers (+25)

Third round
Saturday, 24 July 2010

Langer shot a third round 69 (−2) to take a three stroke lead into the final round. Corey Pavin shot a one-over-par 72, which included two birdies and three bogies. Nine players finished the third round within five strokes of Langer's lead.

Amateurs: Haag (+8)

Final round
Sunday, 25 July 2010

After a birdie on the par-4 2nd hole, Corey Pavin cut Bernhard Langer's lead to two strokes with 16 holes to play. Langer birdied the par-4 5th hole to regain a three shot lead, and extended his lead to four strokes after a bogey by Pavin. After bogies on the 8th and 9th holes, Russ Cochran and Pavin were within two strokes of Langer's lead, and Pavin cut the lead to one after birdieing the 11th. After a late bogey by Pavin, Langer carried a two stroke lead into the 72nd hole. After Pavin made par on the 18th hole, Langer secured bogey to win his first senior major championship by one stroke.

Source:

Amateurs: Haag (+11)

Scorecard

Cumulative tournament scores, relative to par

Source:

References

External links
Results on European Tour website
Results on PGA Tour website

Senior major golf championships
Golf tournaments in Scotland
Senior Open Championship
Senior Open Championship
Senior Open Championship